Ricardo Montero (born 6 March 1986) is a Costa Rican football referee.

Montero became a FIFA referee in 2011 and On 29 March 2018, FIFA announced that he would officiate at the 2018 FIFA World Cup.

References

1986 births
Living people
Costa Rican football referees
2018 FIFA World Cup referees
CONCACAF Champions League referees
CONCACAF Gold Cup referees
Copa América referees